Synhomelix is a genus of longhorn beetles of the subfamily Lamiinae, containing the following species:

 Synhomelix annulicornis (Chevrolat, 1855)
 Synhomelix kivuensis Breuning, 1956

References

Pachystolini